Lord of the Past: A Compilation is a 1989 album by Bob Bennett, his fourth release and only true official 'greatest hits' compilation, including four new songs.  The release reached 30th position on Billboard magazine's Top Contemporary Christian chart in 1990.  Its title song reached number one on the Christian radio charts in early 1990.  In 2013, Urgent Records producer, Phillip Sandifer, was quoted in an interview as saying that the high point of the Urgent Records era was when "Bob Bennett's song 'Lord Of The Past' reached number one on the AC charts."

Track listing
All songs written by Bob Bennett, except where noted.

From First Things First:
"Carpenter Gone Bad – 3:23
"(I Know That) My Redeemer Lives" (text: Samuel Medley; Tune: "Duke Street", John Hatton; adap. Bob Bennett) – 3:16
"You're Welcome Here – 3:31
From Matters of the Heart:
"Matters Of The Heart – 3:30
"1951 – 3:06
"A Song About Baseball – 3:20
"Madness Dancing – 3:16
"Come And See – 2:51
"Mountain Cathedrals – 4:54
From Non-Fiction:
"Saviour Of The World – 5:44
"Still Rolls The Stone – 4:50
New Songs:
"Yours Alone (Words: Bob Bennett, based on "The Lord's Prayer;" Music: Bob Bennett/Roby Duke) – 3:46
"Psalm 149:1-4 – 4:49
"Man Of The Tombs – 5:54
"Lord Of The Past – 5:16

Personnel
Musicians for the tracks new to this recording (12-15) are:

Bob Bennett – acoustic guitar, vocals, composer
Jerry McPherson – electric guitar
Gary Lunn – electric bass
Marvin Steinberg – drums, percussion
Reed Arvin – keyboards
Carl Marsh – Fairlight synthesizer, keyboards, charts, track arrangements
Michele Wagner – background vocals
Jonathan David Brown – producer, recording, mixing
Daniel Jittu, Jeff Straubel, & Marian Peebler – executive producers

Release History
Lord Of The Past: A Compilation was released by Urgent Records in 1989.

References

Bob Bennett (singer-songwriter) compilation albums
1989 greatest hits albums